Jorunn Bjørg Giske (28 September 1927 – 21 January 2021) was a Norwegian politician for the Labour Party.

Career
Giske was born in the municipality of Giske to farmer Bjarne Berntsen Giske and Nikoline Valkvæ. She served as deputy representative to the Storting from Møre og Romsdal during the term 1973–1977. She met during 90 days of parliamentary session.

Giske was elected to the city council of Halden from 1955 to 1959, and to the city council of Trondheim from 1971 to 1983. From 1977 to 1978 she was a board member of the Norwegian Labour Party. She was a board member of the Hotel and Restaurant Workers' Union from 1955 to 1959, and district secretary for the union in Trondhem from 1960 to 1987. From 1975 to 1984 she was board member of the Norwegian Association of Local and Regional Authorities.

Giske died on 21 January 2021.

References

1927 births
2021 deaths
People from Giske
Labour Party (Norway) politicians
Deputy members of the Storting